Protragocerus is an extinct genus of antelope from the late Serravallian Age (around 13 to 11 million years ago) of the Miocene Epoch. Fossils of the genus have been found in France, India, and Saudi Arabia. It is classified under the tribe Boselaphini, subfamily Bovinae of the family Bovidae. The genus was first established by the French paleontologist Charles Depéret in 1887.

One former species, Protragocerus labidotus of Kenya, has been reclassified in its own genus, Kipsigicerus.

See also
Eotragus
Tetracerus
Boselaphus

References

 

Miocene even-toed ungulates
Bovines
Prehistoric bovids
Fossil taxa described in 1987
Prehistoric even-toed ungulate genera
Miocene mammals of Europe
Miocene mammals of Asia